Pterostylis hians, commonly known as the opera house greenhood, is a species of orchid endemic to New South Wales. Non-flowering plants have a rosette of leaves flat on the ground but flowering plants have a single shiny white and green flower. This greenhood is only known from a single location near Ulladulla.

Description
The dorsal sepal and petals are fused, forming a hood or "galea" over the column and the dorsal sepal has a short, sharply pointed tip. Flowering occurs from March to May.

Taxonomy and naming
Pterostylis hians was first formally described in 1997 by David Jones from a specimen collected near Manyana and the description was published in The Orchadian. The specific epithet (hians) is a Latin word meaning "gaping" or "yawning".

Distribution and habitat
The opera house greenhood grows in shrubby forest in a small area near Ulladulla.

References

hians
Endemic orchids of Australia
Orchids of New South Wales
Plants described in 1997